Jan Slavíček (22 January 1900 – 5 April 1970) was a Czech painter, son of painter Antonín Slavíček (1870–1910), brother of director and editor Jiří Slavíček and the successor of the Slavíček family.

Life
He studied at the Academy of Fine Arts, Prague under Jan Preisler, Vratislav Nehleba, Max Švabinský and Otakar Nejedlý (1916–1925).

He was a member of SVU Mánes starting in 1922 and has undertaken a number of study trips to France (including Corsica), Italy, Spain, England, Greece, the USSR and Yugoslavia.

From 1937 to 1970 he lived in the rear wing of the Hrzánský Palace in Hradčany, painting the views of Prague from his studio window.

Awards
1953 Klement Gottwald State Prize laureate
1967 National Artist

Slavíček had been known for his still life and landscape painting including many painting of views in Prague. He dealt with the impulses of French fauvism in his early years, but soon found his own painting expression, based on sensual realism. Many landscapes use the Orlické Mountains.

References

External links
 Informační systém abART  – osoba:Slavíček Jan

1900 births
1970 deaths
20th-century Czech painters
Czech male painters
Czech Impressionist painters
Artists from Prague
20th-century Czech male artists